Dulce Beat (Sweet Beat) is the second album from the Mexican electropop band Belanova.

The album was recorded between 2004 and 2005 in Buenos Aires, Argentina and Guadalajara, Jalisco, Mexico. It was officially released in Mexico on June 21, 2005, following the single "Me Pregunto". The album was produced by Cachorro López and was written by the band's singer, Denisse Guerrero. Dulce Beat was a commercial and critical success, reaching number-one and ensuring double platinum in Mexico. It has become Belanova's most successful album. In 2006, the album was released in several other countries across the world, including Chile, Spain, Argentina, and the United States. In Argentina, the band performed at radio shows and concerts where they presented the single "Me Pregunto". In Chile they performed at The Roxy, presenting all the tracks on the album. Belanova and Mach & Daddy played a concert in Los Angeles in front of 50,000 people to promote their projects; in this show, Belanova performed a cover of the song "Boys Don't Cry" by the band The Cure. On August 12, 2006, E! Latin America, aired a TV Special of Belanova, with interviews and making of the album. Singles from the album became massive hits, both of them ("Me Pregunto" and "Por Ti") became the band's second and third number-one singles in Mexico consecutively, further singles, "Rosa Pastel" and "Niño" became top five hits, the latter spending almost fifty weeks inside the chart.

Dulce Beat 2.0 

A new edition of the album, entitled Dulce Beat 2.0, was released in Mexico on June 5, 2006, and in the United States on August 1. In Mexico, the re-issue debuted at number-three on the album charts and spent several weeks inside the top ten.

Track listing
All tracks by Belanova

Dulce Beat

Dulce Beat 2.0
(Released 5 June 2006 in Mexico and 1 August 2006 in the United States)
CD1
Same as above, except the track 'Te Quedas o Te Vas', which is a different vocal version.

CD2
"Me Pregunto" [Acoustic Version] – 3:58
"Por Ti" [Acoustic Version] – 4:08
"Suele Pasar" [Acoustic Version] – 3:46
"Tus Ojos" [Mijangos House Mix] – 4:46
"Me Pregunto" [Imazué Latin Mix] – 4:55
"Por Ti" [Jose Spinnin's Peak Hour Reconstruction] – 6:21
"Por Ti" [Sound Art Remix] – 4:34
"Enhanced Section":
"Me Pregunto" (Video)
"Por Ti" (Video)

Acoustic Versions of the songs included on the CD2 of Dulce Beat 2.0 were produced by Belanova

Personnel
Edgar Huerta - Keyboards, Synths & Beats
Ricardo Arreola – guitar, bajo sexto
Denisse Guerrero – vocals
Cachorro López – arranger, producer, musical direction
Andres Mijangos – producer, mastering, mixing, program assistant
Sebastián Schon – guitar, engineer, choir arrangement
Patricio Villarejo – cello
Production: Cachorro López
Recording & Mixing: Mondo Mix, Buenos Aires, Argentina.
Record Engineer: Sebastián Schon
Second Engineer: Damián Nava
Mixed by Cesar Sogbe
Musical Direction: Cachorro López
Co-Produced by Andres Mijangos & Belanova
Additional Programming: Andres Mijangos
Additional Vocals on "Te Quedas o Te Vas": Israel Ulloa
Guitars: Ganimedes "Gani"
Record Engineer: Juan Antonio Paez
Mixed by Juan Antonio Paez & Andres Mijangos
Mastered by José Blanco in Master House Studios, Miami, Florida.
Art Direction and Design: Pico Adworks
Photography: Ricardo Trabulsi.

Charts

Sales and certifications

References 

2005 albums
Belanova albums
Albums produced by Cachorro López